The Burnaby Citizens Association (BCA) is a social-democratic municipal political party in Burnaby, British Columbia. It was founded in 1955 by Alan Emmott and Eileen Dailly. The BCA is the official municipal affiliate of the BC NDP in Burnaby, and membership in the BCA requires membership in the BC NDP as a prerequisite.

In October 2018 the BCA won 7 of 8 seats in the city council 2018 municipal election but the BCA incumbent Derek Corrigan lost the mayoral race to  independent Mike Hurley.

On February 5, 2020 three councillors resigned from the BCA over housing policy disagreements and other party issues. In the 2021 by-election, following the deaths of two city councillors, the BCA won one of the two seats up for election.

References

External links 
 Official BCA website
 Burnaby mayor and council

Municipal political parties in British Columbia
Burnaby
Political parties established in 1955
Social democratic parties in Canada
1955 establishments in British Columbia